Hedvig Karakas (born 21 February 1990) is a Hungarian judoka. She is a World Championship bronze medalist, and multi-time European medalist (silver in 2015, and bronze in 2009 and 2010).  She competed in the women's 57 kg event at the 2012 and 2016 Summer Olympics. She also competed in the women's 57 kg event at the 2020 Summer Olympics held in Tokyo, Japan.

In 2009, she won bronze at the World Championships, and the gold medal at the World Junior Championships.

At the 2012 Summer Olympics, she beat Concepción Bellorín by uchi-mata, then beat future Olympic gold medalist Rafaela Silva, before losing to Corina Căprioriu.  Because Căprioriu reached the final, Karakas was entered into the repechage.  There she beat Irina Zabludina but lost her bronze medal match to Automne Pavia. At the 2016 Olympics, Karakas beat Rushana Nurjavova and Catherine Beauchemin-Pinard before losing to Rafaela Silva.  As Silva reached the final, Karakas was entered into the repechage, where she lost to Lien Chen-ling.

References

External links
 

1990 births
Living people
Hungarian female judoka
Olympic judoka of Hungary
Judoka at the 2012 Summer Olympics
Judoka at the 2016 Summer Olympics
People from Szolnok
European Games silver medalists for Hungary
European Games medalists in judo
Judoka at the 2015 European Games
Judoka at the 2019 European Games
Judoka at the 2020 Summer Olympics
Sportspeople from Jász-Nagykun-Szolnok County